The Eurylaimidae are a family of suboscine passerine birds  that occur from the eastern Himalayas to Indonesia and the Philippines. 
The family previously included the sapayoa from the Neotropics, the asities from Madagascar, and the Calyptomenidae from Africa and Asia, but these are now separated into distinct families.

Description
Many of the species are brightly coloured birds that present broad heads, large eyes and a hooked, flat and broad beak. They range from 13 to 28 centimetres in length, and live in the dense canopies of wet forests, allowing them to hide despite their brightly coloured plumage. The plumage of the juvenile eurylaimids are similar to those of the adults, differing in being duller and shorter-winged and shorter-tailed in some cases.

Behaviour and ecology
They are for the most part insectivorous and carnivorous. Prey taken includes insects, spiders, centipedes, and millipedes, as well as lizards and tree frogs. Prey is obtained by sallying from a perch to snatch it in flight, and gleaning the prey off leaves and branches while flying. Some species may take some fruit, but only the green broadbills of the genus Calyptomena and the Grauer's broadbill are primarily frugivores (which also take some insects).

They are generally gregarious, with many species moving about in flocks of about 20 individuals. They  attach their purse-shaped nests to suspended vines, and leave a tail of fibres hanging below it. This gives the nest the appearance of being random debris caught in the tree, an effect further enhanced by the birds covering the nest with lichen and spider webs. Broadbills typically lay two to three eggs.

Taxonomy and systematics
The family Eurylaimidae was introduced in 1831 (as Eurylaimes) by the French naturalist René Lesson. A study by Carl Oliveros and colleagues published in 2019 determined the phylogenetic relationships of the Eurylaimidae to other families in the Eurylaimides (Old World suboscines):

A study published in 2017 determined the following phylogenetic relationships among the Eurylaimidae:

 
The family includes nine species of which five are each placed in their own monotypic genus:

Notes

References

External links

Broadbill videos on the Internet Bird Collection

 
Tyranni
Bird families
Taxa named by René Lesson